Damavand may refer to one of these:
Mount Damavand, the highest peak in Iran
Damavand County, a county in Tehran Province
Damavand, Iran, the capital of Damavand County
Damavand Mineral Water, an Iranian brand of mineral water
Damavand Street, a street in central and eastern Tehran
Damavand College
Iranian frigate Damavand